Huayna Cotoni or Wayna Qutuni(Aymara wayna young (man), bachelor, qutu heap, pile, -ni a suffix to indicate ownership ("the one with a heap"), Qutuni a neighboring mountain, "young Qutuni", Hispanicized spellings Huayna Cotoni, Huaynacotoni, Huaynacutuni) is a mountain in the Cordillera Central in the Andes of Peru, about  high. It is located in the Lima Region, Yauyos Province, on the border of the districts of Ayaviri, Quinches and Tanta. Huayna Cotoni is in a sub-range of the Cordillera Central named Pichqa Waqra (Quechua for "five horns", also spelled Pichcahuajra) on the southern border of the Nor Yauyos-Cochas Landscape Reserve. It lies between the lakes named Tikllaqucha in the north and Huayna Cotoni in the south, southwest of the peak of Qutuni and south of Aqupallqa.

References

Mountains of Peru
Mountains of Lima Region